Persica is an annual multidisciplinary peer-reviewed academic journal published by Peeters Publishers. It is the official journal of the Genootschap Nederland-Iran (Dutch-Iranian Society). The journal is abstracted and indexed in the Index Islamicus. Articles are published in English, French, or German.

External links 

Iranian studies journals
Annual journals
Multilingual journals
Publications with year of establishment missing
Peeters Publishers academic journals
Academic journals associated with learned and professional societies